"Say Goodbye" is a single by American electronic dance music band Krewella. It was the first single released by Krewella since the departure of member Kris "Rain Man" Trindl. It was released on November 24, 2014, during a livestream in which viewers thought they were going to 'speak out' about the recent lawsuit involving band member Trindl.

Background
In September 2014, it was announced that member Rain Man was no longer a member of Krewella. Trindl claimed damages and wanted compensation from the Yousaf sisters in a total of $5 million, claiming they had kicked him out of the band unfairly. The case was finalized in October, 2015 however a response was not issued to the public. The lawsuit also states that the sisters conspired to kick him out of the group to reap high financial rewards whilst he was attending Alcoholics Anonymous meetings and Rehab for his drinking problem. The Yousaf sisters Jahan and Yasmine then counter-sued stating that Trindl had resigned. They claimed that Trindl was having substance and alcohol problems as well as "pretended to DJ" onstage."

DJ Deadmau5 called out the sisters multiple times on the lawsuit and their skills as DJ's. The Yousaf sisters changed their Facebook, Twitter, and SoundCloud  accounts in late november; to black with the words "Say Goodbye" printed in a dark grey font so that it was hard to read. The sisters then announced a livestream in which they would "speak out" about the lawsuit. This was done by releasing "Say Goodbye" moments after the livestream onto iTunes, Spotify and other digital platforms. The lyrics in "Say Goodbye" are in reference to the lawsuit and Trindl. The fact that there was no real "speaking out" was met with negative views of the sisters, and the 40,000 people who watched the livestream felt "jelted or betrayed".The song was met with an instant of negative, and hateful criticism. Since the lawsuit in September the band have been under scrutiny by the public.  It was heavily influenced by rock, which they called on their SoundCloud page "Emo 'n' Bass", a reference to the drum and bass influences in the song.

Track listing

References 

Columbia Records singles
2014 singles
2014 songs
Krewella songs